Peru sent a delegation of four athletes to compete in three sports at the 2008 Summer Paralympics in Beijing, China.

Equestrian
 Rosa Loewenthal

Powerlifting

Swimming

Men

See also
2008 Summer Paralympics
Peru at the Paralympics
Peru at the 2008 Summer Olympics

References

External links
Beijing 2008 Paralympic Games Official Site
International Paralympic Committee

Nations at the 2008 Summer Paralympics
2008
Paralympics